Ostrožin is a village in central Croatia, in the municipality of Gvozd, Sisak-Moslavina County. It is connected by the D6 highway.

History
The Ostrožin Rulebook (Croatian: Ostrožinski pravilnik) was adopted on 14 December 1941 in Ostrožin. Predating the Foča Regulations by more than a month, the Ostrožin Rulebook was the first legal act which regulated the new national authority in the liberated territories during the national liberation war of Yugoslavia.

Demographics
According to the 2011 census, the village of Ostrožin has 32 inhabitants. This represents 8.14% of its pre-war population according to the 1991 census.

According to the 1991 census, 94.91% of the village population were ethnic Serbs (373/393), 0.76% were ethnic Croats (3/393), 0.51% were Yugoslavs (2/393) and 3.82% were of other ethnic origin (15/393).

Notable natives and residents 
 Ognjeslav Utješinović Ostrožinski (1817–1890) - politician and writer

References 

Populated places in Sisak-Moslavina County
Serb communities in Croatia